Friendshoring or allyshoring is the act of manufacturing and sourcing from countries with shared values. As countries take geopolitics into account in their risk assessments, friendshoring allows them to access global markets while also mitigating risk.

Origin 
Bonnie Glick first used the term "allied shoring" at the start of the Covid-19 pandemic, while serving as the deputy administrator of the United States Agency for International Development. In June 2021, the term "ally-shoring" was used in an article by the Brookings Institution. In April 2022, Janet Yellen used the term "friend-shoring" in one of her speeches, and the White House spoke of “ally and friendshoring” in a June 2022 report on resilient supply chains.

Advantages of friendshoring 
Friendshoring can help mitigate supply chain risk stemming from geopolitical tensions wherein countries have full control over the flow of important materials. When appropriately balanced with reshoring, friendshoring can promote supply chain resiliency.

Friendshoring makes supply chains more reliable since it reduces dependencies on countries that are not allies. For example, companies operating in China have experienced substantial interruptions due to its zero-COVID policy. Additionally, global supply chains have been thrown into disarray due to Russia's Invasion of Ukraine.

When onshoring is unfeasible or impossible, friendshoring can be a useful practice to employ to maintain offshore operations but also mitigate risk. For example, lithium, along with other raw materials, are only available in specific parts of the world. Also, if complex, mature supply chains are already developed for a particular supply or service, it is impractical to move everything onshore and friendshoring would be beneficial.

In many industries such as the automotive industry, finished goods are made through the trade of intermediate goods with other countries. In such a case, relying on friendshoring rather than onshoring is critical.

Criticism
Friendshoring can potentially lead to more expensive products if countries depart from areas with low production costs. Economists have also suggested that friendshoring can potentially lead to supply shocks and lower growth over time. 

Raghuram Rajan, former governor of the Reserve Bank of India, is critical of the "friend-shoring" development, voicing concerns about its impact on global free and fair trade. If a developing country is not considered a friend due to a perceived misalignment of values, they may be denied opportunities they could otherwise benefit from. For example, many developing countries have not adopted the US sanctions on Russia after the latter's invasion of Ukraine to avoid reducing trade. If this disqualifies them from being considered a friend or ally of the US, they would lose economic opportunity from the US.

One of the difficulties of employing the friendshoring strategy is in defining a friend or an ally. In some cases, a military ally can also be a strong economic competitor. Additionally, a country's status as a friend or ally can change over time. This fluidity makes it difficult for companies or countries to make long-term decisions based on these designations.

While friendshoring can strengthen relations between two countries that are allies, it can exacerbate tension with countries that are not considered for it. This can potentially lead to political and economic instability.

Moving business out of a country due to a lack of shared values does not always reap the benefits of risk mitigation, supply chain resiliency, and reliability. If motivated for purely political reasons, the financial and supply chain impact can sometimes make friendshoring impractical.

The World Trade Organization estimates that global production would reduce by 5% if friendshoring results in a divide between the east and west trading blocs. 

Friendshoring should be used as a defense mechanism, rather than an attacking one. For example, the US should not use friendshoring to harm China's economy, which could escalate into a cold war and potentially a hot war. Rather, they should use friendshoring to protect against supply chain interruptions. This can be achieved by selecting strategically important products and then sourcing suppliers and increasing production in other countries, rather than severing ties completely.

References 

Geopolitical terminology
International business
Supply chain management
United States foreign policy